Larix griffithii, the Sikkim larch, is a species of larch, native to the eastern Himalaya in eastern Nepal, Sikkim, western Bhutan and southwestern China (Xizang, Yunnan), growing at  in altitude.

It is sometimes called the Himalayan larch, not to be confused with Larix potaninii var. himalaica, which is generally known as the 'Langtang larch'.

Description
The crown is slender conic; the main branches are level to upswept, the side branchlets pendulous from them.

The old cones commonly remain on the tree for many years, turning dull grey-black.

Taxonomy
It has 2 accepted variants;
 Larix griffithii var. griffithii
 Larix griffithii var. speciosa 

Synonyms of the variants; include Abies griffithiana J. D. Hooker ex Lindley & Gordon and Larix griffithiana hort. ex Carrière. 

This taxon has been accepted by the Flora of China but not widely elsewhere.

References and external links

griffithii
Trees of the Indian subcontinent
Flora of Tibet
Flora of Yunnan
Deciduous conifers